The 1985 Berlin Marathon was the 12th running of the annual marathon race held in Berlin, West Germany, held on 29 September. Britain's James Ashworth won the men's race in 2:11:43 hours, while the women's race was won by Belgium Magda Ilands in 2:34:10. Switzerland's Heinz Frei (1:57:28) and Gabriele Schild (2:33:51), won the men's and women's wheelchair races. A total of 9810 runners finished the race, comprising 9146 men and 664 women.

Results

Men

Women

Wheelchair men

Wheelchair women

References 

 Results. Association of Road Racing Statisticians. Retrieved 2020-06-07.
 Berlin Marathon results archive. Berlin Marathon. Retrieved 2020-06-07.

External links 
 Official website

1985
Berlin Marathon
1980s in West Berlin
Berlin Marathon
Berlin Marathon